Pintea is a surname. Notable people with the surname include:

 Adrian Pintea (1954–2007), Romanian actor
 Crina Pintea (née Ailincăi; born 1990), Romanian handballer
 Gherman Pântea or Pîntea (1894–1968), Bessarabian-born soldier, civil servant and political figure
 Horatio Pintea (born 1962), Canadian table tennis player
 Pintea the Brave (Grigore Pintea, 1670-1703), Romanian heroic rebel
 Valentin Pîntea (born 1962) is a Romanian gymnast
 Vasile Pîntea (born 1951), Moldovan politician

See also

Romanian-language surnames